Koloso Sumaili served as governor of Maniema province, Democratic Republic of the Congo, from 26 May 2004 to 16 March 2007.

References

Living people
Democratic Republic of the Congo politicians
People from Maniema
Year of birth missing (living people)
21st-century Democratic Republic of the Congo people